Three Men and a Girl is a lost 1919 American romantic comedy film directed by Marshall Neilan and starring Marguerite Clark. It was produced by Famous Players-Lasky and distributed by Paramount Pictures. The film is based on the off-Broadway play The Three Bears by Edward Childs Carpenter.

Plot
As described in a film magazine, Sylvia Weston (Clark) is a capricious young woman who says "I do NOT" when she leaves a rich groom at the altar. She runs away in her bridal gown to a bungalow she owns at Loon Lake, only to find it occupied by three men with grudges against women. They expel her and her old nurse to a nearby cabin and stake out a line over which the women are not to cross. One by one the three men come to love Sylvia. The two older men, thinking that she is unhappily married, propose to adopt her and provide her with some clothes other than her bridal gown and swimming suit, which is all she has at the cabin. The younger one, however, is wiser and wins her in the end.

Cast
Marguerite Clark as Sylvia Weston
Richard Barthelmess as Christopher Kent
Percy Marmont as Dr. Henry Forsyth
Jerome Patrick as Julius Vanneman
Ida Darling as Theresa Jenkins
Charles Craig as Dallas Hawkins
Sidney D'Albrook as Guide
Betty Bouton as Mrs. Julia Draper
Maggie Fisher as Abbey (credited as Maggie H. Fisher)

References

External links

Still taken during production, left to right: Richard Barthelmess, Percy Marmont, Marguerite Clark, and Jerome Patrick (University of Washington, Sayre collection)

1919 films
American silent feature films
Films directed by Marshall Neilan
Lost American films
Paramount Pictures films
American black-and-white films
American romantic comedy films
1919 romantic comedy films
1919 lost films
American films based on plays
1910s American films
Silent romantic comedy films
Silent American comedy films